Alastair John Clarke (1917–1988) was an Australian rugby league player who played in the 1940s.

Career
Born in Lismore, New South Wales, Clark (often misspelt Alister) played two seasons for St. George in 1942 and 1945, including the 1942 Grand Final.

He later shifted to Canterbury-Bankstown for two seasons in 1947–1948, and played in the 1947 Grand Final before retiring from rugby league.

Death
Clarke died on 26 September 1988 aged 71.

References

1917 births
1988 deaths
St. George Dragons players
Canterbury-Bankstown Bulldogs players
Australian rugby league players
Rugby league hookers
Rugby league second-rows
Rugby league players from Lismore, New South Wales